The Bergmann 1896 was a 19th-century semi-automatic pistol developed by German designer Louis Schmeisser and sold by Theodor Bergmann's company. A contemporary of the Mauser C96 and Borchardt C-93 pistols, the Bergmann failed to achieve the same widespread success, although Bergmann himself later went on to design one of the earliest practical and successful sub-machine guns, the MP-18.

The first cartridges in Bergmann pistols were grooveless, with the bullets having a sharp nose to avoid jams. Later pistols, however, have mechanical extractors and cartridges with grooved flanges. The M96 had an internal box-magazine holding five cartridges.

M1893 and M1894 prototypes 
The initial design patented in 1893 was chambered for a rimless 8mm cartridge. Versions designated M1893 and M1894 were evaluated and rejected by Swiss, German, and Belgian military trials; and the M1896 design reflected improvements to correct shortcomings reported by those trials.

M1896 production 
While the earlier models had been manufactured by Louis Schmeisser, the M1896 was built under license by Charles V. Schilling of Suhl. Three cartridges were chambered for the M1896 pistols. Approximately 2,000 small pistols designated M1896 No. 2 were chambered for the 5mm Bergmann. Production of a larger pistol was approximately 4,400 M1896 No. 3 chambered for the 6.5mm Bergmann, plus two or three hundred M1896 No. 4 chambered for the 8mm Bergmann.

M1897 improvements 
With the commercial success of civilian sales for the M1896, Bergman made additional modifications hoping to obtain military contracts. The M1897 was chambered for a new 7.8mm Bergmann cartridge, and the most obvious change was a more modern detachable 10-shot magazine housed in front of the trigger. The magazine could be fed by a stripper clip. Most were sold with a hollow shoulder stock. A few had  barrels with either a conventional carbine configuration or a detachable wooden shoulder stock. Bergmann was again unsuccessful in obtaining military contracts, and the similar Mauser C96 captured an increasing share of civilian sales. Production was discontinued after approximately 1,000 M1897s had been manufactured.

Pop culture 

In the 1971 Technicolor Western film Big Jake , the character Michael McCandles { played by Christopher Mitchum } , uses a Bergmann 1896 as his sidearm. It is worth noting however, that the pistol was called a Bergmann Mark 1911 in the film, and the actual prop gun was made  by modifying a Walther P38 to superficially resemble a Bergmann 1896.

The blaster pistol utilized by the titular character in the 2019 television series The Mandalorian is based on the Bergmann M1894 nº 1.

The Bergmann No.3 is featured as a usable weapon in Hunt: Showdown as the "Bornheim No. 3". 3 variants exist - the pistol, a pistol with a custom 8-round fixed magazine and a long barrelled carbine with a fixed wire stock.

See also
 Laumann Pistol

References

External links
 Bergmann 1896 nº 2 in 5x15mm

19th-century semi-automatic pistols
Semi-automatic pistols of Germany
Weapons and ammunition introduced in 1896